The France – Saint Lucia Agreement on Delimitation is a 1981 treaty between France and Saint Lucia which delimits the maritime boundary between Saint Lucia and the French territory of Martinique.

The treaty was signed in Paris on 4 March 1981. The text of the treaty sets out a boundary that is an equidistant line between the two islands in the Saint Lucia Channel. The boundary is set out in an east–west direction and consists of 17 straight-line maritime segments defined by 18 individual coordinate points. The far western point of the boundary is the tripoint with Venezuela and the far eastern point is the tripoint with Barbados. Commentators have noted that it is curious that the treaty does not refer to the island of Martinique.

The treaty came into force upon signature. The full name of the treaty is Agreement on Delimitation between the Government of the French Republic and the Government of Saint Lucia.

See also
 Barbados–France Maritime Delimitation Agreement

Notes

References
 Anderson, Ewan W. (2003). International Boundaries: A Geopolitical Atlas. Routledge: New York. ;  OCLC 54061586
 Charney, Jonathan I., David A. Colson, Robert W. Smith. (2005). International Maritime Boundaries, 5 vols. Hotei Publishing: Leiden. ; ; ; ; ;  OCLC 23254092

External links
Full text of agreement

1981 in France
1981 in Saint Lucia
Treaties concluded in 1981
Treaties entered into force in 1981
Boundary treaties
Martinique–Saint Lucia border
Treaties of Saint Lucia
1981 in the Caribbean
Bilateral treaties of France